The Château de Quintin is a castle in Quintin, Côtes-d'Armor, Brittany, France.

History
The castle was partly built in 1775.

Architectural significance
It has been listed as an official monument since 1983.

References

Châteaux in Côtes-d'Armor
Monuments historiques of Côtes-d'Armor